Alexander McDonald Paterson (October 12, 1871 – March 30, 1953) was a Canadian politician. He served in the Legislative Assembly of British Columbia from 1924 to 1928 from the electoral district of Delta, a member of the Liberal party. He also served as the Reeve of Delta for 28 years.

References

1871 births
1953 deaths